was the sixth studio album released by  Japanese rock band The Blue Hearts. It was also the second consecutive album by the band to reach #1 on the Oricon charts.

Track listing
"Sutegoma" (すてごま Sacrifice)
"Yume" (夢 Dreams)
"Tabibito" (旅人 Travelers)
"Kitai Hazure no Hito" (期待はずれの人 Disappointed People)
"Yaru ka Nigeru ka" (やるか逃げるか Do It or Go Away)
"Tetrapod no Ue" (テトラポットの上 On a Tetrapod)
"Taifū" (台風 Typhoon)
"Inspiration" (インスピレーション)
"Ore wa Ore no Shi o Shinitai" (俺は俺の死を死にたい I Want to Die My Death)
"44 Kōkei" (44口径 44 Diameter)
"Usotsuki" (うそつき Liar)
"Tsuki no Bakugekiki" (月の爆撃機 Moon Bomber)
"1000 no Violin" (1000のバイオリン 1000 Violins)

References

The Blue Hearts albums
1993 albums